Fendi is a village in the commune of Béni Ounif, in Béni Ounif District, Béchar Province, Algeria. The village is located next to a wadi at the end of a local road leading south from its intersection with the N6 highway west of Béni Ounif.

References

Neighbouring towns and cities

Populated places in Béchar Province